Hauenstein is a municipality in the Südwestpfalz district, in Rhineland-Palatinate, Germany. It is situated in the Palatinate forest, approximately 20 km east of Pirmasens, and 20 km west of Landau.

Hauenstein is the seat of the Verbandsgemeinde ("collective municipality") Hauenstein.

It is an important centre for the shoe industry, and is home to the German Shoe Museum (Deutsches Schuhmuseum).

References

Palatinate Forest
South Palatinate
Südwestpfalz